"Sorry You're Not a Winner" / "OK Time for Plan B" is the first physical single by Enter Shikari and second overall. It was released in 2006. It is available from their online store
and from iTunes. The physical release was available on CD and 7" vinyl.

Both "Sorry You're Not a Winner" and "OK Time for Plan B" were included on Enter Shikari's debut album, Take to the Skies and given commas in their titles ("Sorry, You're Not a Winner", "OK, Time for Plan B"). "Sorry You're Not a Winner" was nominated for the Kerrang! Award for Best Single.

"OK Time For Plan B" was selected for inclusion in the soundtrack for the EA Sports video game Madden NFL 08 while "Sorry You're Not a Winner" is included in the soundtrack for NHL 08.

Track listing

Band line-up
Roughton "Rou" Reynolds (vocals, electronics)
Liam "Rory" Clewlow (guitar)
Chris Batten (bass, vocals)
Rob Rolfe (drums)

Guitar
The song is played in Drop C# tuning (D# A# F# C# G# C#).

Video
The video for Sorry You're Not A Winner shows the band performing in Chris' parents' front room with the band, several of their fans dancing and miming the lyrics. The Batten family moved out of the house days later. The video was directed by Alex Smith, who was notable for directing the videos for Coldplay's 'Yellow' and The Darkness 'I Believe In A Thing Called Love'. Smith went on to direct Enter Shikari's 'We Can Breathe In Space...' video. 
An unofficial video for OK Time for Plan B can be seen on vocalist/electronicist Rou Reynolds YouTube page, and features the band performing in an disused dairy local to the band. with several friends dancing and moshing while the band perform the song on early learning toy instruments.

Chart performance

References

External links
  Sorry You're Not Winner video
 OK, Time for Plan B

2006 singles
Enter Shikari songs
Wikipedia requested audio of songs
2006 songs